Ramón Hernández (born 1 July 1953) is a Cuban fencer. He competed in the team sabre event at the 1976 Summer Olympics.

References

1953 births
Living people
Cuban male fencers
Olympic fencers of Cuba
Fencers at the 1976 Summer Olympics
Pan American Games medalists in fencing
Pan American Games gold medalists for Cuba
Fencers at the 1979 Pan American Games
20th-century Cuban people
21st-century Cuban people